The Order of the Star of Italian Solidarity was founded as a national order by the first President of the Italian Republic, Enrico De Nicola, in 1947, to recognise civilian and military expatriates or foreigners who made an outstanding contribution to the reconstruction of Italy after World War II. 

In 2011, the order was reformed as the Order of the Star of Italy by the 11th President, Giorgio Napolitano. The emphasis of the reformed award was shifted from post-war reconstruction to the preservation and promotion of national prestige abroad, promoting friendly relations and co-operation with other countries and ties with Italy.

Order of the Star of Italian Solidarity (1947–2011)

The insignia, modified in 2001, bore the inscription Solidarietà Italiana encircling a depiction of the Good Samaritan. The order is bestowed by decree of the President of the Republic, head of the order, on the recommendation of the Minister of Foreign Affairs.

The three degrees with corresponding ribbons were as follows:

The Order of the Star of Italian Solidarity was worn as follows:

Recipients 

 Carlo Ancelotti
 Ebba Atterbom
 Teodor Baconschi
 Mario Biaggi
 Boyko Borisov
 Eliana Bórmida
 Everett Francis Briggs
 Paata Burchuladze
 Charlene, Princess of Monaco
 Carlo Azeglio Ciampi
 Domenick Cocco 
 Francesco Cossiga
 Ritu Dalmia
 Dan Daniel
 Jatin Das
 James del Piano
 John Dickie
 Moira Lenore Dynon - June 5, 1967
 Irena Eris
 Bernard Evans
 Linda Fabiani
 Genevieve Fiore
 Foster Furcolo
 Gaetano Gagliano
 Wolfgang Haas
 Grace Kelly
 Anthony Lacavera
 Gabriel Liiceanu
 Lawrence Lotito
 Fabio Luisi
 Yuri Lyubimov
 Mauricio Macri
 Henry Mavrodin
 Íñigo Méndez de Vigo
 Amina Mohamed
 Manuel Monteiro de Castro
 Khaldoon Al Mubarak
 Hidetoshi Nakata
 Mariana Nicolesco
 Andrei Oișteanu
 George Paciullo
 Costanza Pascolato
 Solomon Passy
 Michel Pastor
 Drew Pearson
 Andrei Pleșu
 Victor Ponta
 Robert D. Putnam
 Silvio Scionti
 Giovanni Scognamillo
 Shim Hwa-jin
 Andriy Shevchenko
 Frank Sinatra
 James S. Snyder
 Elisabeth Söderström
 George Sperti
 Jean Tennyson
 Alfa Tofft
 Zeynep Karahan Uslu
 Radu Varia

See also
List of Italian orders of knighthood
Order of the Crown of Italy

References

External links

 Presidenza della Repubblica - Le Onorificenze- Ordine della Stella d'Italia 

Star of Italian Solidarity, Order of the
Star of Italian Solidarity, Order of the
1947 establishments in Italy

de:Orden des Sterns von Italien